The Taurangakautuku River is a river of the Gisborne Region of New Zealand's North Island. It flows northeast from the northern foothills of the Raukumara Range to reach the Awatere River eight kilometres southwest of Te Araroa.

See also
List of rivers of New Zealand

References

Rivers of the Gisborne District
Rivers of New Zealand